"Nights in White Satin" is a song by the Moody Blues, written and composed by Justin Hayward. It was first featured as the segment "The Night" on the album Days of Future Passed. When first released as a single in 1967, it reached number 19 on the UK Singles Chart and number 103 in the United States in 1968. It was the first significant chart entry by the band since "Go Now" and its recent lineup change, in which Denny Laine and Clint Warwick had resigned and both Hayward and John Lodge had joined.

When reissued in 1972, the single hit number two in the United States for two weeks on the Billboard Hot 100 (behind "I Can See Clearly Now" by Johnny Nash) and hit number one on the Cash Box Top 100, making it the band's most successful single in the United States. It earned a gold certification for sales of over a million US copies (platinum certification was not instituted until 1976). It also hit number one in Canada. After two weeks at #2, it was replaced by "I'd Love You to Want Me" by Lobo. It reached its highest UK position this year at number 9. Although the song did not enter the official New Zealand chart, it reached #5 on the New Zealand Listeners chart compiled from the readers' votes in 1973.

The song enjoyed a recurring chart presence in the following decades. It charted again in the UK and Ireland in 1979 reaching #14 and #8, respectively. The song charted again in 2010, reaching number 51 in the British Official Singles Charts. It has also been covered by numerous other artists, most notably Giorgio Moroder, Elkie Brooks, and Sandra.

Production
Band member Justin Hayward wrote and composed the song at age 19 while touring in Belgium and titled the song after a girlfriend gave him a gift of satin bedsheets. The song itself was a tale of a yearning love from afar, which leads many aficionados to term it as a tale of unrequited love endured by Hayward. Hayward said of the song, "It was just another song I was writing and I thought it was very powerful. It was a very personal song and every note, every word in it means something to me and I found that a lot of other people have felt that very same way about it."

The melody of the song resembles that of Ben E. King's 1963 song "I (Who Have Nothing)", although the instrumentation makes "Nights in White Satin" sound different.

The London Festival Orchestra provided the orchestral accompaniment for the introduction, the final rendition of the chorus, and the "final lament" section, all of which were in the original album version. The "orchestral" sounds in the main body of the song were actually produced by Mike Pinder's Mellotron keyboard device, which would come to define the "Moody (Blues)'s signature sound".

The song is written in the key of E minor and features the Neapolitan chord (F).

Single releases
The two single versions of the song were both stripped of the orchestral and "Late Lament" poetry sections of the LP version. The first edited version, with the songwriter's credit shown as "Redwave", was a hasty-sounding 3:06 version of the LP recording with very noticeable chopped parts. However, many versions of the single are listed on the labels at 3:06, but in fact are closer to the later version of 4:26.

Some versions, instead of ending cold as most do, segue briefly into the symphonic second half ("Late Lament") and, in fact, run for 4:33 (but are also listed on the label as 3:06). For the second edited version (with the song's writing credited to Hayward), the early parts of the song were kept intact, ending early at 4:26. Most single versions were backed with a non-LP B-side, "Cities".

Reception
Although it only had limited commercial success on its first release, the song has since garnered much critical acclaim, ranking number 36 in BBC Radio 2's "Sold on Song Top 100" list.

Cash Box said that the "intense mood of the funk orchestration serves up an atmosphere that penetrates to the very core of this depressed love ballad" and praised the "terrific instrumental break and a searing vocal."

Classic Rock critic Malcolm Dome rated it as the Moody Blues' greatest song, calling it "one of the best singles from the late 60s."  Ultimate Classic Rock critic Nick DeRiso rated it as the Moody Blues' 2nd greatest song. Classic Rock History critic Brian Kachejian rated it as the Moody Blues' 8th greatest song, calling it "a great song, a beautiful historic song."

"Late Lament"
The spoken-word poem heard near the six-minute mark of the album version of the song is called "Late Lament". Drummer Graeme Edge wrote the verses, which were recited by keyboardist Mike Pinder. On Days of Future Passed, the poem's last five lines bracket the album and also appear at the end of track 1 ("The Day Begins").

While it has been commonly known as part of "Nights in White Satin" with no separate credit on the original LP, "Late Lament" was given its own listing on the two-LP compilation This Is The Moody Blues in 1974 and again in 1987 (without its parent song) on another compilation, Prelude. Both compilations feature the track in a slightly different form than on Days of Future Passed, giving both spoken and instrumental tracks an echo effect. The orchestral ending is kept intact, but mastering engineers edited out the gong (struck by Mike Pinder) that closes the track on the original LP as it relates to the closing of the original album (with Side 1 beginning with the gong fading in) and not the track alone.

From 1992 through the early 2000s, the Moody Blues toured with shows backed by live orchestras. When with orchestral accompaniment, they often took the opportunity to include "Late Lament" in the performance of "Nights in White Satin". On these occasions, Edge recited it himself, since Pinder had left the band.

Personnel
 Justin Hayward – 12-string acoustic guitar, lead vocals
 Ray Thomas – flute, backing vocals
 Mike Pinder – Mellotron, backing vocals, narration (on "Late Lament"), gong
 John Lodge – bass, backing vocals
 Graeme Edge – drums, backing vocals, percussion

Additional personnel
 Peter Knight and the London Festival Orchestra – orchestral arrangements

Charts

Weekly charts

Year-end charts

Certifications

Sandra version

A cover version of "Nights in White Satin" was released by the German singer Sandra on her sixth studio album Fading Shades (1995). Her version was produced by Michael Cretu.

The song was released as the lead single off Fading Shades in the spring of 1995 and failed to match the success of Sandra's previous singles. The song only reached #86 in Germany, becoming her least successful lead single there to date, and #34 in New Zealand, where it remains her only charting single. It fared much better in Israel where it peaked at number 1, and was a Top-20 hit in Finland, and a top 10 airplay hit in Poland.

The music video, directed by Angel Hart, showed only close-ups of Sandra's face as she was pregnant at the time. A still from the video was later used on the Fading Shades album cover. The music video was released on Sandra's 2003 DVD The Complete History.

Formats and track listings
 CD maxi single
 "Nights in White Satin" (Radio Edit) — 3:35
 "Nights in White Satin" (Club Mix) — 6:05
 "Nights in White Satin" (Techno Mix) — 5:29
 "Nights in White Satin" (Jungle Mix) — 6:09
 "Nights in White Satin" (Dub Version) — 4:02

 12" maxi single
A1. "Nights in White Satin" (Club Mix) — 6:05
A2. "Nights in White Satin" (Techno Mix) — 5:29
B1. "Nights in White Satin" (Jungle Mix) — 6:09
B2. "Nights in White Satin" (Dub Version) — 4:02

Charts

Elkie Brooks Version
 Elkie Brooks recorded the song for her 1982 album Pearls II

7 Single UK and Ireland
A. Nights In White Satin	4:35
B. Lilac Wine (Live Recording) 6:08

7 Single Promo 
A. Nights In White Satin	4:35
B. Lilac Wine (Live Recording) 6:08

7 Single New Zealand and Australia
A. Nights In White Satin 4:37
B. Thank You For The Light 3:31

7 Single Spain
A. Nights In White Satin	4:35
B. Lilac Wine (Live Recording) 6:08

Other cover versions
 Italian band Nomadi released a version of the song as a single in 1968 with the title Ho difeso il mio amore reaching #20 in the Italian chart. The lyrics of this version differ significantly from the original.
 German singer Juliane Werding covered the song in German as "Wildes Wasser" for her 1973 album Mein Name ist Juliane. The single reached #40 in Germany.
 Giorgio Moroder recorded the song as "Knights in White Satin" for a 1976 album of the same name. His cover reached #44 on the Walloon singles chart in Belgium. Moroder also recorded another version with Joe Bean Esposito for the 1983 album Solitary Men.
 Los Angeles punk rock band the Dickies recorded a cover of the song for their 1979 LP Dawn of the Dickies. Released as a single, it charted in the top 40 on the UK singles charts.
 Nancy Sinatra recorded the song as "Nights in White Satin" for a 1995 "One More Time" studio Album.
 The group Il Divo released their cover "Nights in White Satin (notte di luce)" on the 2006 album Siempre. Their version reached #81 in Switzerland.
 A cover by the Dutch singer Erwin Nyhoff reached the top 5 in the Netherlands in 2012.
 A cover by American singer Jennifer Rush in her 1995 album Out of my hands produced  by Jürgen Fritz.
 Rachael Leahcar recorded a cover of the song for her debut album Shooting Star (2012). The song reached #43 in Australia.
 Olav Stedje and Ole Brum's orchestra covered the song in Norwegian as "Snøkvite blomar" for their 1977 album Heime igjen.

Theme park attraction and other uses
The work was reinterpreted as the focus of Nights in White Satin: The Trip, a dark ride at the Hard Rock Park theme park in Myrtle Beach, South Carolina, U.S.A. The attraction, which included 3D-black light and fibre-optic lighting effects and purpose-made films, was developed by Sally Corporation and Jon Binkowski of Hard Rock Park. Riders entered through a bead curtain and were provided with 3D glasses. The attraction operated as "The Trip" for the single 2008 season the park operated as Hard Rock Park, but was rethemed as "Monstars of Rock" with the sale and retitling of the park as Freestyle Music Park; "park officials said the experience will be similar but the presentation will be changed." Freestyle Music Park would cease operations after its only season as such in 2009.

Nights in White Satin was the title of a 1987 film directed by Michael Barnard, and starring Kip Gilman and Priscilla Harris. The Moody Blues recording of the song was featured prominently in the soundtrack, particularly during a rooftop dance sequence.

See also
 List of Cash Box Top 100 number-one singles of 1972

References

External links
 Lyrics of this song
 

1960s ballads
1967 singles
1967 songs
1972 singles
1979 singles
1995 singles
Cashbox number-one singles
Deram Records singles
Elkie Brooks songs
Eric Burdon songs
Grammy Hall of Fame Award recipients
Number-one singles in France
Pop ballads
Proto-prog songs
Rock ballads
RPM Top Singles number-one singles
Sandra (singer) songs
Song recordings produced by Michael Cretu
Songs about nights
Songs written by Justin Hayward
Symphonic rock songs
The Moody Blues songs
The Shadows songs
Virgin Records singles